Jessica Pressler (born 1977/78) is an American journalist and contributing editor at New York magazine. Her 2015 article "The Hustlers at Scores", was nominated for a National Magazine Award, and was later made into a feature film called Hustlers in 2019. She also wrote a story about Anna Sorokin that was  later developed into the mini-series Inventing Anna released by Netflix in 2022.

Early life
Her mother, Judith Pressler, was a guidance counselor at Swampscott High School and her father, Michael Pressler,  was a professor of English and the director of the interdisciplinary arts program at Shippensburg University in Pennsylvania.

Career
Pressler became the co-editor of New York magazine's Daily Intel blog in 2007 after working as a staff writer at  Philadelphia magazine and as a freelancer for celebrity magazines. At New York, she has written extensively on "the culture of wealth and money," interviewing Wall Street CEOs such as Goldman Sachs Lloyd Blankfein and AIG CEO Robert Benmosche about their firms’ involvement in the 2008 financial crisis. Pressler has profiled New York personalities Lynn Tilton and Anthony Scaramucci.  Her feature articles about the feud between Chris Burch and Tory Burch and the culture of Silicon Valley startups have appeared in The Best Business Writing editions.

In 2014, Pressler wrote a story about a Stuyvesant High School senior who had allegedly made $72 million trading stocks, which was later revealed to be not true. Bloomberg News rescinded a job offer made to her for their investigative unit after the student confessed he had "made the whole thing up."

On December 28, 2015, Pressler published an article for New York called "The Hustlers at Scores", a story about strippers who manipulated money out of their clients. She was nominated for a National Magazine Award in 2016. A team of producers that included Will Ferrell "snapped up" the film rights in February 2016. The story was adapted into a film by Gloria Sanchez Productions titled Hustlers; it stars Keke Palmer, Constance Wu and Jennifer Lopez, with Julia Stiles portraying "Elizabeth", a fictionalized version of Pressler. The film was released in 2019.

In 2018, she wrote a story about New York City high society grifter Anna Sorokin, which was developed into the mini-series Inventing Anna by Netflix and Shonda Rhimes. Pressler's book, "Bad Influence: Money, Lies, Power, and the World that Created Anna Delvey", is scheduled for publication in 2022.

Pressler has also written for GQ,  Elle,  Esquire and  Smithsonian. She was a regular Gossip Girl episode recap writer for Vulture website, and made an appearance as a New York magazine editor in one of its episodes.

Personal life
In 2008, she married Benjamin Wallace, a freelance magazine writer and author. They later divorced, and she is now married to Josh Uhl.

References

External links 

1970s births
21st-century American journalists
21st-century American women writers
Living people
American magazine journalists
American women journalists
Journalists from Massachusetts
New York (magazine) people
People from Marblehead, Massachusetts
Temple University alumni